Donald Mathieson (born 24 April 1931) is an Australian former cricketer. He played two first-class cricket matches for Victoria between 1953 and 1954.

See also
 List of Victoria first-class cricketers

References

External links
 

1931 births
Living people
Australian cricketers
Victoria cricketers